Edward (French-language title Édouard) is a Canadian animated series produced by CinéGroupe that consists of a single season of 65 episodes, each 30 seconds in length. It first aired from January 23, 2002 to September 19, 2003 on Teletoon in Canada.

The show spotlights the odd, humorous title character as he ponders the meaning of life. It uses Flash animation, and is inspired by the book series Mots de tête by Quebec writer Pierre Légaré. Production of the cartoon was announced in 2001.

Some episodes are available in French on CinéGroupe's distribution YouTube channel.

References

2000s Canadian animated television series
2002 Canadian television series debuts
2003 Canadian television series endings
Canadian children's animated comedy television series
Canadian flash animated television series
English-language television shows
Teletoon original programming